Laila Majnu is a 1976 Indian Hindustani-language romantic drama film directed by Harnam Singh Rawail and starring Rishi Kapoor, Ranjeeta and Danny Denzongpa in lead roles. The film's music is by Madan Mohan and Jaidev. Based on the legend of Layla and Majnun, it tells the story of two star-crossed lovers: Laila, a princess and Qais a.k.a. Majnu, a common man.

Laila Majnu marked the debut of Ranjeeta. Upon its release in 1976, it garnered highly positive reviews from film critics, and became a box-office success. The humongous success of the film cemented Rishi Kapoor's status as a bankable star; for after his debut in Bobby (1973), he did not have any major success before Laila Majnu, with the exception of Kabhi Kabhie (1976). However, the success of that film was credited towards Shashi Kapoor and Amitabh Bachchan. Since its release in 1976, Laila Majnu is hailed as a cult classic.

Plot
Laila and her lover Majnu, better known as Qais, were born to rival clans, the Amaris and the Sharwaris. The two loved each other as children. Their love was such that if one was hurt, the other started bleeding. The film recounts, how as kids at the madarsa, the maulvi asks them to write the name of Allah on their slates. Qais, who is lost in thoughts of Laila, inscribes her name instead. In return, an incensed maulvi canes him on the hand. But it is Laila's hand which starts bleeding. Incidents such as this, spread like wild fire and Laila's father, scared for his daughter's reputation, decides to stop her from going to school. The two clan heads decide to separate their children as it is impossible for them to conceive of the Sharwaris and the Amaris ever being joined by love instead of blood. Laila and her Majnu grow up in different places.

Many years later, Qais and his friends visit Laila's town to buy camels and the stage is set for the two lovers to meet again. One day at the marketplace, they encounter each other and it is love at first sight for both of them. They start meeting each other secretly, all over again. But the villain makes his entry in the form of Laila's hot-tempered brother Tabrez (Ranjeet). He has already had a spat with Qais, with neither knowing the other's true identity. In the turn of events that follow, Qais's father dies at the hands of Tabrez. Qais in turn, avenges his father's murder by killing Tabrez. He is exiled from the town and wanders about in the dunes, like a madman, thirsting for just a look of his beloved. Meanwhile, Laila is married off to a prince, Bakhsh (Danny). Learning of her love for Qais, he promises to keep his distance until such time that he is not able to replace Majnu in Laila's heart. Like all others before him, he is unable to understand the almost divinely ordained love of Laila and Majnu. When he does, it is too late.

Cast

 Rishi Kapoor as Majnu / Qais Al Amri
 Ranjeeta Kaur as Laila
 Danny Dengzongpa as Prince Bahksh
 Feroz

Soundtrack
Film's music is by Madan Mohan  and Jaidev with lyrics by Sahir Ludhianvi.

The songs of the movie were hits. Especially "Is Reshmi Paazzeb Ki Jhankar", "Tere Dar Par Aaya Hoon", " Barbad-E-Mohabbat ki Dua" and "Husn Hazir Hai". "Husn Hazir Hai" also reached number one on the Binaca Geetmala annual list 1977, a rarity for a Madan Mohan composed song.

Release and reception

Box office
The film was a major success.
But it was ignored by National film award & Filmfare award as it is not even nominated in any categories

See also 
 Yusuf and Zulaikha
 Shirin and Farhad
 Heer Ranjha

References

External links 
 

1979 films
1970s Hindi-language films
Films scored by Madan Mohan
Films based on Indian folklore
Films directed by H. S. Rawail
Films scored by Jaidev